The Will Rogers Turnpike is a freeway-standard toll road in the northeast portion of the U.S. state of Oklahoma. The highway begins as a continuation of the Creek Turnpike in Tulsa, continuing northward from the I-44/US-412 interchange there to the Missouri state line west of Joplin, Missouri. The turnpike carries the I-44 designation for its entire length. The Will Rogers Turnpike opened to traffic on June 28, 1957. It was designated as I-44 in 1958. It is named for Will Rogers, "Oklahoma's Favorite Son".

Route description

The Will Rogers Turnpike begins at an interchange between I-44, US-412, and the Creek Turnpike on the northeast side of Tulsa, straddling the line between Wagoner County and Rogers County. The Creek Turnpike ends at this interchange, with northbound Creek Turnpike traffic continuing onto the Will Rogers Turnpike. I-44 eastbound traffic also merges into the turnpike here. The turnpike heads north to its first interchange, which provides an exit to East Pine Street for westbound traffic and an entrance to the eastbound turnpike. North of the Pine Street interchange, the highway curves to a more northeast course, crossing the Verdigris River. In Verdigris, the turnpike has an interchange at the eastern terminus of SH-266. The turnpike continues northeast to Claremore, county seat of Rogers County, where it junctions SH-20; it also passes over SH-88 in Claremore, with no access provided between the two highways. The turnpike then continues northeast out of Rogers County.

After leaving Rogers County, the Will Rogers Turnpike enters Mayes County. The only interchange in Mayes County is a partial interchange with SH-28 west of Adair. Eastbound motorists can exit the turnpike at SH-28 and motorists on SH-28 can join the turnpike heading westbound. From this interchange, SH-28 continues northeast, entering Craig County.

North of Big Cabin, the Will Rogers Turnpike comes to a junction with US-69. Just northeast of this interchange is the only mainline barrier toll plaza on the turnpike. After the toll plaza, the highway passes under the McDonald's restaurant at the Vinita service plaza (see below). On the east side of Vinita, the road comes to an interchange with US-60 and US-69. From Vinita, the turnpike continues northeast out of Craig County.

The final county that the Will Rogers Turnpike serves is Ottawa County. The first interchange in Ottawa County lies northeast of Afton; here, motorists can access US-59, US-60, and US-69. The turnpike continues to its final interchange, near the county seat, Miami. This interchange serves SH-10. Just north of this interchange is a welcome center for westbound traffic. The highway continues northeast to the state line. I-44 continues east into Newton County, Missouri toward Joplin and Springfield.

History
Because the Will Rogers Turnpike was built prior to authorization of the Interstate Highway System (in 1956), it uses a different set of design standards than today's. As the road has been rebuilt, this is being brought in line with current design practice.

The original route of the Turnpike continued straight into and through Tulsa, becoming Skelly Drive in town (where tolls are not charged). The westernmost portion of the Will Rogers Turnpike was modified so that the Creek and Will Rogers Turnpikes form one road, with motorists required to exit at an interchange to stay on I-44. The original interchange was changed due to numerous difficulties for semis trying to merge into the single lane going to I-44 and Route 66. The new interchange was incorporated into an upgrade of US 412, with provisions for future expansion of the turnpike over a decade later, creating the Creek Turnpike bypass around the Metropolitan area, connecting back to the Turner Turnpike. The remaining pavement of the old alignment is now used as a training ground for the Oklahoma Highway Patrol, among others.

Tolls
A two-axle vehicle currently pays $5.00 ($4.40 with Pikepass) to drive the full length of the Turnpike. The Will Rogers Turnpike (as well as the Turner Turnpike on the other side of Tulsa) uses a somewhat unusual tolling system. The Turnpike has only one barrier toll plaza, located southwest of Vinita, at which drivers pay the full toll and are issued a receipt. If one exits before reaching this plaza or enters at an interchange past the plaza, the toll for the portion traveled is collected at the interchange. If one's desired exit is located after the plaza, the motorist pays the full toll at the barrier plaza, then presents their receipt at the ramp for a refund of the untraveled portion. If one enters at an interchange before the main plazas, a ticket is issued at the ramp and presented at the barrier plaza; the fare for the untraveled portion is deducted from the full toll. This system was implemented in 1992.

Services
Law enforcement along the Will Rogers Turnpike is provided by Oklahoma Highway Patrol Troop XA, a special troop assigned to the turnpike.

Vinita service plaza

The Will Rogers Turnpike's most prominent service plaza lies between the toll plaza and the Vinita exit. The main feature of this service plaza is a  McDonald's bridge restaurants spanning the turnpike. Customers can view the traffic passing beneath the restaurant from the dining area through windows overlooking the highway. At the front of the west anchor stands a statue of Will Rogers. A Phillips 66 gas station is also available for both directions of travel at the plaza.

The architecture of the McDonald's building is dominated by golden arches on both sides of the building that appear from a distance to be not only the corporate symbol of the chain, but the primary supports for a steel arch bridge structure over the turnpike. Visitors to the eatery exit from either side of the interstate, and then enter through one of the sides and then proceed to the restaurant level via stairs or an elevator.

The building hosting the McDonald's restaurant was originally built when the turnpike opened in 1957 as one of the Glass House restaurants, owned by the now-defunct Interstate Hosts company. Because of this heritage, it is also known as the "Glass House McDonald's" and the "McDonald's Glass House Restaurant". the building originally operated as a Howard Johnson's restaurant.

The McDonald's is purported to be the "world's largest." However, the biggest temporary McDonald's in the world was opened during the 2012 Summer Olympics in London, which had  but it was demolished after the 2012 Summer Olympics.

The building and service plaza closed on June 4, 2013, for a complete renovation. It reopened on December 22, 2014 with a McDonald's, Subway, and Kum & Go gas stations.  It reopened as the Will Rogers Archway.

Exit list
Exit numbers follow I-44 unless otherwise noted.

See also

Will Rogers
Pikepass
Oklahoma Turnpike Authority

References

External links

 Oklahoma Turnpike Authority
 Brief information page about the service plaza
 History from Oklahoma Modern
 Postcards from the original "Glass House"
 Another postcard of the original "Glass House"

Toll roads in Oklahoma
Tolled sections of Interstate Highways
Interstate 44
Transport infrastructure completed in 1957
Transportation in Wagoner County, Oklahoma
Transportation in Rogers County, Oklahoma
Transportation in Mayes County, Oklahoma
Transportation in Craig County, Oklahoma
Transportation in Ottawa County, Oklahoma
1957 establishments in Oklahoma